Ebanks is an English surname. Notable people with the surname include:

Ambuyah Ebanks (born c. 1985), Miss Cayman Islands Pageant 2006 winner
Derrin Ebanks (born 1988), Caymanian footballer who plays midfielder
Devin Ebanks (born 1989), American basketball player
Jason Ebanks (born 1988), Caymanian footballer who plays midfielder
Jedd Ebanks (born 1988), Caymanian footballer who plays defender
Joe Ebanks (born c. 1985), American poker player
Jorge Ebanks (born 1986), Caymanian basketball player
Mark Ebanks (born 1990), Caymanian footballer who plays forward
Nicholas Ebanks (born 1990), Caymanian footballer who plays defender
Raymond Ebanks (born 1970), Finnish rapper
Ronald Ebanks (born 1983), Caymanian cricketer
Ryan Ebanks (born 1984), Caymanian cricketer
Selita Ebanks (born 1983), Caymanian fashion model
Sharon Ebanks (born 1967/68), former member of the British National Party and one of the founder members of the New Nationalist Party
Wayne Ebanks (born 1964), English former footballer who played right-back

See also
Sylvan Ebanks-Blake (born 1986), English footballer who plays striker for Wolverhampton Wanderers F.C.
Ethan Ebanks-Landell (born 1992), English footballer who plays defender

English-language surnames